The 2020 Balkan Athletics Championships was the 73rd edition of the annual track and field competition for athletes from the Balkans, organised by Balkan Athletics. It was held on 19 and 20 September at the Cluj Arena in Cluj-Napoca, Romania.

Results

Men

Women

Medal table

References

Results
73rd BALKAN SENIOR CHAMPIONSHIPS. Balkan Athletics. Retrieved 2020-09-20.

External links
Balkan Athletics website

2020
Balkan Athletics Championships
Balkan Athletics Championships
Balkan Athletics Championships
International athletics competitions hosted by Romania
Sport in Cluj-Napoca